In electronic commerce, conversion marketing is marketing with the intention of increasing conversions—that is, site visitors who are paying customers.

Measures 
Conversion marketing attempts to solve low online conversions through optimized customer service, which requires a complex combination of personalized customer experience management, web analytics, and the use of customer feedback to contribute to process flow improvement and site design.

By focusing on improving site flow, online customer service channels, and online experience conversion marketing is commonly viewed as a long-term investment rather than a quick fix . Increased site traffic over the past 10 years has done little to increase overall conversion rates, so conversion marketing focuses not on driving additional traffic but converting existing traffic. It requires proactive engagement with consumers using real time analytics to determine if visitors are confused and show signs of abandoning the site; then developing the tools and messages to inform consumers about available products, and ultimately persuading them to convert online. Ideally, the customer would maintain a relationship post-sale through support or re-engagement campaigns. Conversion marketing affects all phases of the customer life-cycle, and several conversion marketing solutions are utilized to help ease the transition from one phase to the next.

Conversion rate

The conversion rate is the proportion of visitors to a website who take action to go beyond a casual content view or website visit, as a result of subtle or direct requests from marketers, advertisers, and content creators.

Successful conversions are defined differently by individual marketers, advertisers, and content creators. To online retailers, for example, a successful conversion may be defined as the sale of a product to a consumer whose interest in the item was initially sparked by clicking a banner advertisement. To content creators, a successful conversion may refer to a membership registration, newsletter subscription, software download, or other activity.

Measurement
For websites that seek to generate offline responses, for example telephone calls or foot traffic to a store, measuring conversion rates can be difficult because a phone call or personal visit is not automatically traced to its source, such as the Yellow Pages, website, or referral. Possible solutions include asking each caller or shopper how they heard about the business and using a toll-free number on the website that forwards to the existing line.

For websites where the response occurs on the site itself, a site's analytics package can be used to track user behaviour.

Common conversion marketing services 
Recommendations Behavioral analysis that identifies products and content relevant to the customer's perceived intent.
Targeted offers Targeting attempts to fit the right promotion with the right customer based upon behavioral and demographic information.
Ratings and reviews Using user-generated ratings and reviews to increase conversion rates, capture feedback, and engender visitor's trust.
Email personalization E-mail with embedded recommendations and chat that are tailored personally to the recipient.
Chat As consumers tend to abandon sites after only three clicks, attempts to use proactive chat, reactive chat, exit chat, and click-to-call to convert consumers quickly.
Click-to-call Supports cross-channel conversion without losing the context of the conversation when visitors move from the website to the phone.
Call to action (marketing) Statement designed to get an immediate response from the person reading or hearing it. Broadly used in business as part of a digital strategy to get your users to respond through one single action.
Cobrowsing Tool for support agent infrastructure (chat or call) to assist customers in transacting online. 
Voice of the customer Feedback about products, services, and online experiences that is captured through carefully analyzed structured and unstructured data.
Automated guides predetermined steps that allow a customer to better understand product features, and options to assist with the selection process.
Retargeting Identification of visitors interested in particular products or services based on previous site browsing or search to offer relevant content through targeted ad placement.

Methods of increasing conversion rate

The process of improving the conversion rate is called conversion rate optimization. However, different sites may consider a "conversion" to be a result other than a sale. Say a customer were to abandon an online shopping cart. The company could market a special offer, like free shipping, to convert the visitor into a paying customer. A company may also try to recover the customer through an online engagement method, such as proactive chat, to attempt to assist the customer through the purchase process.

Among many possible actions to increase the conversion rate, the most relevant may be:
 Employ Attention, Interest, Desire, Action (AIDA) principles to design the user experience through the conversion funnel
 Enhance the user's credibility and trust in the site, the product, and the business by displaying third-party trust logos and by quality site design 
 Improve site navigation structure so that users can browse and shop with minimal effort
 Improve and focus the website content, including text, photographs, illustrations, and video, towards target conversion 
 Review, and edit or remove obsolete or distracting data
 Increase usability to reduce barriers to conversion
 Create a self-serving customer service format by letting the user reach informative answers quickly with a learning database.
 Offer active help (e.g. live chat, co-browsing)
 Generate user reviews of the product or service
 Gather a baseline user experience by recording user actions and compiling key objections 
 Enable clear tracking of standardized metrics using website analytics software for a predetermined conversion goal (e.g. "increase volume of newsletter subscriptions" or "decrease shopping cart abandonment percentage rate")
 Take repeated action to monitor and improve the site, based on quantitative and qualitative metrics

See also
 Customer intelligence
 Win–loss analytics

References

 Berkeley-Study on Conversion rate in Spam 

Digital marketing